Largus is a genus of American true bugs in the family Largidae.

Species
Species include:
 Largus bipustulatus Stål 1861
 Largus californicus (Van Duzee, 1923)
 Largus cinctus Herrich-schaeffer, 1842
 Largus convivus Stål 1861
 Largus davisi Barber, 1914
 Largus humilis (Drury, 1782)
 Largus maculatus Schmidt, 1931
 Largus pallidus Halstead, 1972
 Largus sculptilis Bliven, 1959
 Largus sellatus (Guérin-Méneville, 1857)
 Largus semipletus Bliven, 1959
 Largus semipunctatus Halstead, 1970
 Largus succinctus (Linnaeus, 1763)
 Largus trochanterus Schmidt, 1931

References

Pentatomomorpha genera
Largidae
Fauna of North America